The Reconquest is a 2016 Spanish romantic drama film directed by Jonás Trueba which stars Francesco Carril, Itsaso Arana, Candela Recio, Pablo Hoyos and Aura Garrido.

Plot 
It is set in Madrid. Manuela and Olmo meet again 15 years after their first love.

Cast 
 Francesco Carril as Olmo
 Itsaso Arana as Manuela
 Aura Garrido as Clara
 Candela Recio as Manuela (teenager)
 Pablo Hoyos as Olmo (teenager)

Production 
Produced by Los Ilusos Films, the film had the participation of TVE and Movistar+. It was shot on location in Madrid. Santiago Racaj worked as cinematographer, whereas Javier Lafuente took over production duties.

Release 
The film was presented on 22 September 2016, screened in the 64th San Sebastián International Film Festival's official selection. Distributed by Cine Binario, it was theatrically released in Spain on 30 September 2016.

Reception 
Jonathan Holland of The Hollywood Reporter underscored the film to be "self-indulgent but sharp-eyed", Trueba's most intimate film yet, displaying "sincerity" and "evident love of cinema", yet being "less lively, less fun (and funny)" than prior Trueba's pictures and wondered that it be fun to see Trueba to try to work beyond his Rohmerian comfort zone.

Andrea G. Bermejo of Cinemanía gave the film 4 out 5 stars, assessing that Francesco Carril and Itsaso Arana are able to talk, drink and dance "as if the film were life itself".

Quim Casas of El Periódico de Catalunya scored 4 out of 5 stars, deeming The Reconquest to be "an excellent film about the passage of time and its consequences".

Pere Vall of Fotogramas gave it 4 out of 5 stars, praising the "beautiful" planning of the swing dance scene.

See also 
 List of Spanish films of 2016

References 

Films set in Madrid
Films shot in Madrid
2010s Spanish-language films
Spanish romantic drama films
2016 romantic drama films
2010s Spanish films